Ygor is a forename, a variant of Igor (given name) and may refer to:

 Ygor (footballer, born 1984), Brazilian football midfielder
 Ygor (footballer, born 1986), Brazilian football striker
 Ygor Catatau (born 1995), Brazilian football forward
 Ygor Nogueira (born 1995), Brazilian football centre-back
 Ygor Coelho (born 1996), Brazilian badminton player
 Ygor, a film role played by actor Bela Lugosi in a pair of Universal Frankenstein films
 an alternative spelling for Igor (character)